She'z (Hangul: 쉬즈) was a South Korean girl group formed by independent company Line Entertainment in 2012. The group consists of Jinah, Taeyeon, Seyeon and Jiyoung. They made their official debut on May 17, 2012 with the song "My Way" (내 맘대로).

History

Pre-debut
The group has already caught the attention of the public due to their connections with famous personalities. They have been closely acquainted with numerous MCs and comedians such as Ji Suk Jin, Moon Hee Jun and so on, through their agency, Line Entertainment. They also gained attention after their company stated that all members are able to sing and perform at the level of the lead vocalist in any other idol groups, which allows She'z to experiment with several different musical genres.

Jinah and Taeyeon were appointed as MCs with Shin Dong Yup even before their official debut. They were confirmed as supporting MCs for Channel Q's ‘Miracle on 7th Street.’. The show was broadcast in mid May, right when the group had debuted.

Taeyeon, earlier in 2012, was also featured on a track by Lee Hyunwook.

2012-2014: Debut and Disbandment
The group's music video for their debut song, "My Way" (내 맘대로), was released on their official YouTube account on May 17, 2012. They debuted on M! Countdown on the same day. The group promoted the song on other various music programs. It also ranked from #140 to #87 in Gaon Chart. Their first single was entitled "She'z Holic".

She'z also contributed to the official soundtrack of Scent of a Woman, with the song entitled "Better Tomorrow".

On June 25, 2012, they released their 1st EP entitled Night and Day (낮과밤).

However, in 2014, the group silently disbanded after releasing their last single, Another Day is Passing.

Members 
She'z has four members: Lee Jin-ah (이진아), Lee Tae-yeon (이태연), Kim Se-yeon (김세연), and Kim Ji-young (김지영).

Discography

EPs and single albums

Singles

References

Musical groups established in 2012
South Korean dance music groups
K-pop music groups
South Korean girl groups
2012 establishments in South Korea